Adeline De Walt Reynolds (September 19, 1862 – August 13, 1961) was an American character actress who made her film debut at the age of 78 playing the grandmother of James Stewart in Come Live with Me (1941). She continued to act in films and numerous television series until her death.

Early life and entrance into film 
Adeline De Walt was born one of 10 children during the Civil War. One of her earliest memories was of Union soldiers returning from the war. She had wanted to be an actress since she was five years old, but her father - Jonathan DeWalt, a farmer - was opposed. As a young woman, she lied about her age (claiming 20 when actually 18) to get a rural-area teaching job. It was a difficult teaching assignment, and had been refused by several other teachers, but she eventually gained the support of the children and their families. After learning that her male colleagues earned more money than she did, and the school board refused to pay her the same rate, she left.

She married Frank Reynolds, with whom she had four children, after leaving teaching. They initially lived in Vinton, Iowa, their hometown, but moved to Arcadia, Nebraska, after a year, and the birth of their first child, Mary in 1885. Reynolds' parents had moved to Arcadia a short time before, and they offered him the father's lumber business. They remained in Arcadia for five years, and had another child, William. After 5 years, the family moved to Boston, and De Walt Reynolds attended and graduated from the Boston Conservatory of Speech. While in Boston, according to some accounts, in 1892, Sir Henry Irving offered De Walt Reynolds a spot in his touring company. She is said to have turned Irving's offer down to raise her children. 

The family moved to Philadelphia, and several other cities, before eventually moving to San Francisco, where the couple had their final two children, Franklin and Lela. After Reynolds' untimely death in 1905, she was forced to earn a living  to raise her four children. She began studies at a San Francisco secretarial school, but the school was destroyed in San Francisco's 1906 earthquake and fire, which she witnessed and survived. She continued to struggle to support her family. When her youngest daughter, Lela, entered college at the University of California,  De Walt Reynolds once again focused on her own goals. Encouraged by her daughter, De Walt Reynolds entered Berkeley at the age of 64. She majored in French and graduated with honors at 68.

Upon graduation, De Walt Reynolds took acting courses at the university, under the tutelage of Professor von Neumeyer. While she was cast as Hecuba in a school production of The Trojan Women, she made contact with celebrated stage actress Blanche Yurka, who had played the same role in a radio production of the play. The following year, she traveled to Los Angeles and contacted Yurka, asking her advice on beginning a career in film. Yurka found an agent willing to take on an older client, and De Walt Reynolds was cast in a role in an Assistance League production of Landslide.  Clarence Brown saw her in the production and cast her in his upcoming film.

Film career
De Walt Reynolds made her film debut with a supporting role in Come Live with Me (1941), playing the grandmother of James Stewart. When asked if she was tired at the end of her first day on the set, she answered, "If you had waited 70 years to do something, you wouldn't be tired." She received praise for that role. Clarence Brown called her a "potential star". 

She was also memorable in the last scene of in Going My Way (1944) as Mother Fitzgibbon, who travels from Ireland to the United States to see her son. Her last film was The Ten Commandments (1956) where she portrayed a frail old woman in danger. She also appeared in numerous television series between 1950 and 1960. She played her last role at the age of 98 and was the oldest member of the Screen Actors Guild at the time. She also made publicity stories and photos which showed her practicing her fencing or doing calisthenics.

De Walt Reynolds died on August 13,1961, one month before her 99th birthday. She is buried in Westwood Memorial Park, Los Angeles.

Partial filmography 
Reynolds made guest appearances on television  between 1950 and 1960. The programs include Have Gun – Will Travel, Shirley Temple's Storybook, Zane Grey Theatre, and Peter Gunn

 Come Live with Me (1941) - Grandma
 Shadow of the Thin Man (1941) - Barrow's Landlady (uncredited)
 The Tuttles of Tahiti (1942) - Mama Ruau 
 Tales of Manhattan (1942) - Elsa's Old Mother (Laughton sequence)
 Iceland (1942) - Grandma (uncredited)
 Street of Chance (1942) - Grandma Diedrich
 The Human Comedy (1943) - Librarian
 Behind the Rising Sun (1943) - Grandmother
 Son of Dracula (1943) - Madame Zimba
 Happy Land (1943) - Mrs. Schneider
 Going My Way (1944) - Mrs. Molly Fitzgibbon (uncredited)
 Since You Went Away (1944) - Elderly Woman on Train (uncredited)
 A Tree Grows in Brooklyn (1945) - Mrs. Waters (uncredited)
 The Corn Is Green (1945) - Old Woman Reading (uncredited)
 Counter-Attack (1945) - Old Woman (uncredited)
 Messenger of Peace (1947) - Grandma Frommel
 The Girl from Manhattan (1948) - Old woman
 The Sickle or the Cross (1949) - Mrs. Burnside
 Stars in My Crown (1950) - Granny Gailbraith (uncredited)
 Kim (1950) - Old Maharanee (uncredited)
 The Du Pont Story (1950) - Old Lady in Window (uncredited)
 Here Comes the Groom (1951) - Aunt Amy (uncredited)
 Lydia Bailey (1952) - Mme. Antoinette d'Autremont
 Pony Soldier (1952) - White Moon
 Witness to Murder (1954) - The Old Lady - Mental Patient
 The Ten Commandments (1956) - Frail Old Lady (uncredited)

References

External links 
 

1862 births
1961 deaths
20th-century American actresses
Actresses from Iowa
People from Vinton, Iowa
Screen Actors Guild
University of California, Berkeley alumni
American television actresses